Pomaderris myrtilloides is a species of flowering plant in the family Rhamnaceae and is endemic to near-coastal areas of southern Western Australia. It is an erect shrub with many branches, narrowly egg-shaped elliptic or wedge-shaped leaves with the narrower end towards the base, and cream-coloured to pale pink flowers.

Description
The upper surface of the leaves is more or less glabrous and the lower surface is covered with minute, star-shaped hairs.

Taxonomy
Pomaderris myrtilloides was first formally described in 1837 by Eduard Fenzl in Enumeratio plantarum quas in Novae Hollandiae ora austro-occidentali ad fluvium Cygnorum et in sinu Regis Georgii collegit Carolus Liber Baro de Hügel from specimens collected by Ferdinand Bauer. The specific epithet (myrtilloides) means "myrtillus-like", referring to a similarity to Vaccinium myrtillus.

Distribution and habitat
This pomaderris grows in near-coastal vegetation on limestone ridges or deep sand on dunes between Albany and Eucla in the south of Western Australia.

Conservation status
Pomaderris myrtilloides is listed as "not threatened" by the Government of Western Australia Department of Biodiversity, Conservation and Attractions.

References

Flora of Western Australia
myrtilloides
Plants described in 1837
Taxa named by Eduard Fenzl